Behzadi-e Neqareh Khaneh (also Romanized as Behzādī-e Neqāreh Khāneh; also known as Behzādī) is a village in Kabgian Rural District, Kabgian District, Dana County, Kohgiluyeh and Boyer-Ahmad Province, Iran. At the 2006 census, its population was 122, in 28 families.

References 

Populated places in Dana County